Histoplasma is a genus of dimorphic fungi commonly found in bird and bat fecal material.<ref name=Baron>{{cite book | author = Giannella RA | title = Salmonella. In: Baron's Medical Microbiology (Baron S et al, eds.)| edition = 4th | publisher = Univ of Texas Medical Branch | year = 1996 | isbn = 0-9631172-1-1| id = (via NCBI Bookshelf) }}</ref> Histoplasma contains a few species, including—Histoplasma capsulatum—the causative agent of histoplasmosis; and Histoplasma capsulatum var. farciminosum (old term, Histoplasma farciminosum''), causing epizootic lymphangitis in horses.

This fungus is mainly found in the Ohio and Mississippi River Valleys in the United States as well as Central/South America, Africa, Asia and Australia.

Forms / Stages 
Histoplasma capsulatum has two forms: its environmental form is hyphae with microconidia and tuberculate macroconidia while its tissue form is a small intracellular yeast with a narrow neck and no bud with no capsule and can be detected in aerobic blood culture bottle. In the saprophytic stage, it bears features of both microconidia and macroconidia. Infection occurs through inhalation of the small microconidia or small mycelia fragments. The dimorphic mold-yeast transforms and enters host macrophages and proliferates within them most often seen in immunodeficient individuals.

References

External links
 Histoplasma information from doctorfungus.org

Onygenales
Eurotiomycetes genera
Taxa described in 1906